This is a list of villages in China. A village is a clustered human settlement or community, larger than a hamlet but smaller than a town, with a population ranging from a few hundred to a few thousand. In China, an administrative village is a type fifth-level administrative division, underneath a township, county, city, and province. There are more than six hundred thousand administrative villages in China. Some villages are not administrative villages but natural villages, which are not administrative divisions. The below list is divided by province, and ideally lists the name of the village followed by the three higher-administrative divisions (e.g. township, county, and city) to which it belongs administratively.

Villages in China

Beijing 
  Cuandixia,  Zhaitang, Mentougou
  Huanghuacheng,  Jiuduhe, Huairou

Tianjin
 Taitou, former village in Gaocun, Wuqing (now a residential community)

Hebei Province

 Donglü, Donglü, Qingyuan, Baoding
 Shengyou,  Dingzhou, Baoding
 Taizicheng, Sitaizui, Chongli, Zhangjiakou

Shanxi Province

 Daiyang village, Jinchang, Dingxiang, Xinzhou
 Dingcun, Xincheng, Xiangfen, Linfen
 Xinguangwu, Zhangjiazhuang, Shanyin, Shuozhou

Inner Mongolia Autonomous Region
In addition to villages, a gaqa (嘎查, ᠭᠠᠴᠠᠭ᠎ᠠ) is another type of fifth-level administrative division, found only in Inner Mongolia; the name is derived from the Mongolian language.

Hanggai, Tiemao, Tumot Left Banner, Hohhot

Liaoning Province
Former Pingdingshan (village), Dongzhou, Fushun

Jilin Province
  Fangchuan, Jingxin, Hunchun, Yanbian

Heilongjiang Province
  Sanjiazi, Youyi, Fuyu, Qiqihar

Shanghai Municipality

Jiangsu Province

 Huaxi,  Jiangyin, Wuxi
 Wangtan, Jieji, Sihong, Suqian
 Zhufan, Shilianghe, Donghai, Lianyungang

Zhejiang Province
 Fujiang, Tonggong, Changshan, Quzhou
 Huangnitang, Zhoutang, Tianma, Changshan, Quzhou
 Shangjing, Tangxi, Wucheng, Jinhua
 Xinye Village, Daciyan, Jiande, Hangzhou
 Yuanjia'ao, Xiaowangmiao, Fenghua, Ningbo
 Zhuge, Zhuge, Lanxi, Jinhua

Anhui Province

Hongcun, Hongcun, Yi, Huangshan
Xidi, Xidi, Yi, Huangshan
Xiaogang,  Fengyang, Chuzhou

Fujian Province
 Qiaodou, Huangshi, Licheng, Putian
 Sanji, Chengjiao, Shaowu, Nanping
 Xiaori, Nanri, Xiuyu, Putian

Jiangxi Province
Likeng Village, Jiangxi, Wuyuan

Shandong Province

 Nanjusi, Chengguo, Laizhou, Yantai
 Shui Dong, Luohe, Ju County, Rizhao
 Xia Tun, Guozhuang, Ju County, Rizhao
 Zhuangjiashan, Ju, Rizhao
 Zhujiayu, Guanzhuang, Zhangqiu, Jinan

Henan Province
  Dingzhai, Dongsong, Luoning, Luoyang
  Nanjie, Chengguan, Linying, Luohe
  Shangfeng, Yangce, Biyang, Zhumadian

Hubei Province

Hunan Province
Changqi, Anjiang, Hongjiang, Huaihua
Ganzi Village, Hanpu Subdistrict, Yuelu District, Changsha
Guoliang Village, Tongguan, Wangcheng, Changsha
Paibi, Paibi, Huayuan, Xiangxi Tujia and Miao Autonomous Prefecture
Zhangguying Village, Zhangguying, Yueyang, Yueyang

Guangdong Province
  Boshe, Jiaxi, Lufeng, Shanwei
  Cuiheng,  Nanlang, Zhongshan
  Dongzhou, Cheng, Shanwei
  Fengjian, Xingtan, Shunde, Foshan
  Shangba, Xinjiang, Wengyuan, Shaoguan
  Taishi, Dongchong, Nansha, Guangzhou
  Wangtang, Jianggu, Sihui, Zhaoqing
  Wukan, Donghai, Lufeng, Shanwei
  Xiqi, Shuaibu, Taishan, Jiangmen

Guangxi Zhuang Autonomous Region 
 Wangtang, Chaotian, Lingchuan, Guilin

Hainan Province
Most counties in Hainan are not subordinate to a prefecture-level subdivision (see List of administrative divisions of Hainan), and so some entries below list only the town and county-level divisions to which the village belongs.

 Luokan, Hongmao, Qiongzhong
 Tianweiban, Donglu, Wenchang
 Tree Island, Yongxing Dao, Xisha, Sansha
 Yagong Island, Yongxing Dao, Xisha, Sansha

Chongqing Municipality

Sichuan Province

Guizhou Province
  Zhongdong,  Ziyun, Anshun

Yunnan Province
  Baishuitai,   
  Bamê, Foshan, Dêqên, Dêqên
  Mijiazhuang,
  Zhengying, Baoxiu, Shiping, Honghe

Tibet Autonomous Region

 Gejizhen

Shaanxi Province
  Dangjia, Xizhuang, Hancheng, Weinan
  Hongliutan, Zhenchuan, Yuyang, Yulin

Gansu Province
 Tai'an, Beiwan, Jingyuan, Baiyin
 Zhelaizhai,  Yongchang, Jinchang

Qinghai Province
  Taktser, Shihuiyao, Ping'an, Haidong

Ningxia Hui Autonomous Region

Xinjiang Uyghur Autonomous Region

Unclear
  Yanglingang

See also

 Ethnic villages of China
 List of cities in China
 List of cities in China by population
 Outline of China
 Villages of China

References

China